Marriage Story is a 2019 drama film written and directed by Noah Baumbach, who also produced the film with David Heyman. It stars Scarlett Johansson and Adam Driver as a warring couple going through a coast-to-coast divorce. Laura Dern, Alan Alda, Ray Liotta, Julie Hagerty, and Merritt Wever appear in supporting roles.

The film was announced in November 2017, with the cast joining that same month. Filming took place in New York City and Los Angeles from January to April of the following year. Released by Netflix, the film premiered at the 76th Venice International Film Festival on August 29, 2019, and began a limited theatrical release on November 6, followed by digital streaming on December 6.

Marriage Story received critical acclaim, particularly for Baumbach's screenplay and direction and the performances of Johansson, Driver and Dern. Among its many accolades, the film received six nominations at the 92nd Academy Awards, including Best Picture, Best Original Screenplay, Best Actor (Driver), and Best Actress (Johansson). For her performance, Dern won the Academy Award, the Golden Globe, the Screen Actors Guild Award, the BAFTA Award and the Critics' Choice Movie Award for Best Supporting Actress.

Plot

Exit Ghost, the theater company owned by Charlie Barber, a successful theater director in New York City, is helming a play that stars his wife, Nicole, a former actress who is very happy to not act anymore. The couple are experiencing marital troubles and see a mediator, who suggests that they each write down what they love about one another, but Nicole is too embarrassed to read hers aloud and they decide to forgo the counseling.

When Nicole is offered a starring role in a television pilot in Los Angeles, she decides to leave the company and temporarily live with her mother in West Hollywood, taking her son Henry. Charlie decides to stay in New York, as the play is moving to Broadway. Despite the couple agreeing to split amicably and forgo lawyers, Nicole hires Nora Fanshaw, a family lawyer, and tells her about how she gradually felt neglected by Charlie and how he rejects her ideas and desires. Nicole also suggests that Charlie slept with Mary Ann, the stage manager of his theater company. Charlie visits his family, revealing that he has won a MacArthur Fellowship grant, but Nicole declares divorce. Charlie meets with Jay Marotta, a brash and expensive lawyer who urges Charlie to fight dirty, but Charlie returns to New York without hiring him. He receives a phone call from Nora, who warns him to get a lawyer soon or risk losing custody of Henry. Charlie returns to Los Angeles and hires Bert Spitz, an empathetic and retired family lawyer who favors a civil and conciliatory approach.

Henry spills to Charlie that Nicole wishes to live in Los Angeles and not move back to New York. A confused Charlie then calls Nicole, angrily interrogating her. Nicole then calls him out, revealing that she hacked his emails and learned of his affair with Mary Ann. Charlie later rents an apartment in Los Angeles, on Bert's counsel, to be closer to his family and strengthen his custody case. Charlie wishes to avoid court, so Bert arranges a meeting with Nora and Nicole. Nora argues that Charlie refused to respect Nicole's wishes to move back to Los Angeles and that Henry would prefer to stay with his mother rather than fly back and forth between coasts. Bert advises Charlie to drop his New York residency altogether, but a frustrated Charlie refuses and fires him.

Using the first payout of his fellowship grant, Charlie hires Jay. The case moves to court, where Nora and Jay argue aggressively on behalf of their clients, leading to a series of character assassinations; Nora highlights Charlie's emotional distance and past infidelity, while Jay exaggerates Nicole's drinking habits and threatens criminal action for hacking Charlie's emails. Meanwhile, Nicole and Charlie remain friendly out of court and share time with Henry, who is increasingly annoyed with the back-and-forth. Disillusioned with the legal process, the pair decide to meet in private. However, their initially friendly discussion turns emotionally vicious; Nicole claims that Charlie has now fully merged with his own selfishness, and Charlie wishes death upon her. He then breaks down in tears and apologizes; Nicole comforts him. Soon after, they agree to relax their demands and reach an equal agreement to finalize the divorce, although Nora negotiates slightly better terms for Nicole, against the latter's wishes.

A year later, Charlie's play enjoys a successful Broadway run, while Nicole has a new boyfriend and is nominated for an Emmy Award for directing an episode of her television series. Charlie informs Nicole that he has taken a residency at UCLA and will be living in Los Angeles full-time to be closer to Henry. Later, he discovers Henry reading Nicole's list of things she loves about Charlie that she had written down during counseling. Henry asks Charlie to read it aloud to him, and Charlie does so, becoming emotional as Nicole watches from afar. After a Halloween party that evening, Nicole offers to let Charlie take Henry home even though it is her night. Charlie walks out to his car carrying Henry, and they part ways once more.

Cast

Jasmine Cephas Jones, Mary Wiseman, Matthew Maher, Gideon Glick, Raymond J. Lee, and Becca Blackwell appear as members of Nicole and Charlie's theater group.

Production
The premise for the film first came to Baumbach in 2016, while in post-production on The Meyerowitz Stories. He began to research the subject, and met with three-time collaborator Driver to discuss the role. In November 2017, it was announced Driver, Scarlett Johansson, Laura Dern, Merritt Wever and Azhy Robertson were set to star in the film. David Heyman produced the film under his Heyday Films banner, and Netflix produced and distributed. In March 2018, Kyle Bornheimer joined the cast of the film, and in June 2018, it was announced that Ray Liotta had also been added.

Principal photography began on January 15, 2018, and lasted 47 days through April 2018, taking place in both New York City and Los Angeles.

Speaking of writing the film following his divorce from actress Jennifer Jason Leigh, as well as his parents' divorce (which served as inspiration for his earlier film The Squid and the Whale), Baumbach said:  Following the release of the film, Baumbach said, "I showed [Leigh] the script and then I showed her the movie a little bit ago. She likes it a lot."

Music 

The music is composed by Randy Newman in his second collaboration with Baumbach, after previously composing for The Meyerowitz Stories (2017). The score was recorded at Newman Scoring Stage in the 20th Century Fox Studios, featuring a 40-piece chamber orchestra with limited instruments. The first track "What I Love About Nicole" was released as a lead single from the album on November 1, 2019, and the score was digitally released on November 15, 2019, followed by a physical release on December 13, 2019, by Lakeshore Records.

Release

Marriage Story had its world premiere at the Venice Film Festival on August 29, 2019, and also screened at the Telluride Film Festival on August 31, 2019, and the Toronto International Film Festival on September 8, 2019, where it was first runner-up for the People's Choice Award. It also served as the Centerpiece selection at the New York Film Festival on October 4, 2019, and the BFI London Film Festival on October 6, 2019. Netflix gave it a limited release in theatres beginning November 6, 2019, before streaming the film starting December 6, 2019.

Home media
The film was released on DVD and Blu-ray by The Criterion Collection on July 21, 2020.

Reception

Box office
Although Netflix does not publicly disclose the theatrical grosses of all of its films, IndieWire estimated Marriage Story grossed around $160,000 from five theaters in its opening weekend (and a total $200,000 over its first five days). The site wrote that "normally, these (estimated) numbers would be disappointing," but "given the theaters and more limited seating, as well as awareness of imminent streaming access within the month" it was sufficient for Netflix. Playing at 16 theaters the following weekend, the film made an estimated $140,000, and then $340,000 from 85 theaters in its third. Expanding to 130 theaters in its fourth weekend of release the film made $360,000, for a month-long running total of $1.2 million. The following weekend, despite being released digitally onto Netflix starting the Friday, the film made an estimated $300,000 from 120 theaters, and then $120,000 from 80 theaters the following week.

Marriage Story grossed an estimated $2 million in North America and $333,686 in other territories, for a worldwide total of $2.3 million.

Critical response

The website's critics consensus reads: "Observing a splintering union with compassion and expansive grace, the powerfully acted Marriage Story ranks among writer-director Noah Baumbach's best works." On Metacritic, it has a weighted average score of 94 out of 100, based on 53 critics, indicating "universal acclaim".

Critic Owen Gleiberman of Variety wrote, "At once funny, scalding, and stirring, built around two bravura performances of incredible sharpness and humanity, it's the work of a major film artist, one who shows that he can capture life in all its emotional detail and complexity — and, in the process, make a piercing statement about how our society now works." Alonso Duralde of TheWrap praised the acting and Baumbach's screenplay, saying, "One wonders if Baumbach left references to Kramer vs. Kramer or Two for the Road on the cutting-room floor, but either way, Marriage Story is a film that deserves to be mentioned in their company. It's devastating, essential, and destined to be remembered long after this awards cycle ends." In his review for The Hollywood Reporter, Jon Frosch concurred, writing: "Other American films about divorce have portrayed this phenomenon — the legal process driving and shaping the couple's feelings rather than vice versa — but none with the force and clarity of this one [...] It's also funny and, when you least expect it (and most need it), almost unbearably tender, thanks in large part to the sensational leads, who deliver the deepest, most alive and attuned performances of their careers." Rating the film 5 stars out of 5, Peter Bradshaw of The Guardian called it a "wonderfully sweet, sad and funny film" that serves as a "glorious laugh-out-loud, cry-out-loud portrait of a relationship in its death throes" and praised the performances of the cast. Writing for The Washington Post, Ann Hornaday gave the film 3.5 stars out of 4 and praised Johansson and Driver as the "two-person fulcrum around which this funny-sad, happy-harrowing movie revolves."

In a mixed review, GQs David Levesley opined that the film was "fundamentally, a good piece of cinema", but disliked the unacknowledged upper-class privilege that the characters possessed, commenting: "The world of third-wave coffee, delicatessens and Upper West Side therapy has been done to death and does not speak to as much of the human condition as the people wading through it themselves seem to think." Armond White of The National Review also panned the film's bourgeois themes and the lead actors' performances, writing: "This story is really about class rivalry clouded by a sex-and-cinema surface. The obnoxious sentimentality of Marriage Story forces a filmmaker's self-righteousness on us ... It is Johansson and Driver who suffer Baumbach's superficiality. This is his least-bad movie only because the quality of the performances [of the supporting cast] is improved."

Internet memes
Despite its tone and themes, Marriage Story has spawned Internet memes. According to Wired, a meme of Adam Driver punching a wall during Charlie and Nicole's argument scene has contributed to "re-contextualizing Charlie and Nicole's fight into something light and silly". Driver punching a wall has been repurposed to represent general arguments over trivial matters in which a participant becomes angry and overreacts.

Accolades

Marriage Story was chosen by the American Film Institute, the National Board of Review, and Time magazine as one of the ten best films of the year. The film received a leading six nominations at the 77th Golden Globe Awards, including Best Motion Picture – Drama, winning one award for Best Supporting Actress – Motion Picture. The film received eight nominations at the 25th Critics' Choice Awards, three nominations at the 26th Screen Actors Guild Awards for the performances of Driver, Johansson, and Dern, five nominations at the 73rd British Academy Film Awards, and six nominations at the 92nd Academy Awards. Time Magazine's annual best performances of the year list by Stephanie Zacharek listed Driver as the third best film acting performance of 2019. Laura Dern won the Best Supporting Actress Award at the 92nd Academy Awards.

References

External links

 
 

2019 films
2019 drama films
2019 independent films
American independent films
American legal drama films
BAFTA winners (films)
British drama films
British independent films
Films about actors
Films about divorce
Films about lawyers
Films about theatre
Films about dysfunctional families
Films directed by Noah Baumbach
Films featuring a Best Supporting Actress Academy Award-winning performance
Films featuring a Best Supporting Actress Golden Globe-winning performance
Films produced by David Heyman
Films scored by Randy Newman
Films set in Los Angeles
Films set in New York City
Films shot in Los Angeles
Films shot in New York City
English-language Netflix original films
2010s English-language films
2010s American films
2010s British films